The stories of Sang Kancil is a series of traditional fables about a clever mouse-deer. They are popular in Indonesia and Malaysia. A weak and small yet cunning figure, Sang Kancil uses his intelligence to triumph over beings more powerful than himself. The protagonist of these stories is Sang Kancil, a smart and sly mouse deer. He can fool the other animals to escape from trouble. This folk figure is similar to another folk figure, Br'er Rabbit.

Sang Kancil and the Farmer 
One day, Sang Kancil is trying to steal cucumbers from a farmer's field. The first time, he steals some cucumbers successfully. He then encounters a scarecrow, and he mocks it because it cannot scare him. He kicks the scarecrow with his front leg, but his front leg gets stuck in the scarecrow, which has been filled with glue by the farmer. He tries to pull out his leg, but in vain as the glue is too strong for him to pull out his leg. Later, the farmer comes and laughs at Sang Kancil, who has been trapped by the glue on the scarecrow. He then puts him inside a cage for the rest of the day. Later that night, the farmer's dog comes to see Sang Kancil. He mocks him and said that he will be cooked the next morning. Sang Kancil stays calm and relaxed. The dog got confused and asks him why. He said, "You are wrong, I'm not going to be cooked! I'm going to be a prince!" The dog becomes more confused. "I’ll marry the farmer's daughter and I will become a prince. I feel sorry for you, all of your loyalties were paid just like this! You just become a dog! Look at me! Tomorrow, I'll become a prince!" said Sang Kancil proudly. The dog, who felt discriminated against by his own master, asks him to switch place. He thinks that by switching place with Sang Kancil, he will become a prince instead. So he opens the cage and lets him free. The next morning, the farmer is confused, because he does not see him anywhere; instead, he sees his own dog in the cage, wagging his tail.

Sang Kancil and the Elephant
One day, Sang Kancil is trapped inside a hole made by some hunters. He screamed for help but no one heard him. He thought it was hopeless for him to escape from the trap. He waited for while until an elephant came. Then, he had an idea. He said, "Hurry, come down here! Come down and seek shelter with me because the sky is falling!" The elephant, confused yet terrified, foolishly followed his order and jumped down into the hole. Sang Kancil quickly hopped onto the elephant's body and then jumped out of the hole, leaving the elephant trapped in the hole.

Sang Kancil and the Crocodiles
One day, Sang Kancil wants to cross a river, but the river is infested hungry crocodiles, who might eat him. Eventually, the deer has an idea, telling the crocs: "You cannot eat me unless you make a row!" To which one of the crocodiles reply, “Why must we do that?”.

Sang Kancil replied: "I will let you all eat me after bringing me to the island.” Believing what he said, the crocodiles followed his order and formed a row of between the two sides of the river. He then quickly hops from one crocodile to another until he reaches the other side of the river, leaving the reptiles far behind, angry.

Another version of the story follows Sang Kancil telling the crocodiles that the king is going to throw a party and all animals are invited. He says that he wants to count the number of family members they have. The crocodiles lined up while Sang Kancil hopped onto their backs while counting, getting to the other side slyly.

Sang Kancil and the Tiger
One day, Sang Kancil was drinking on the river, when a tiger suddenly came who wanted to eat him. Sang Kancil tried to escape, but the tiger was faster than he was. Cornered by the tiger, he thought of how to escape. He said to the tiger, "Your mightiness and toughness are very great, but my king has a greater strength than yours! Nobody can match his!" Feeling taunted, the tiger declared he would challenge this “king”. He led the tiger to the river and told him, "Look at the water and you will see my king." The tiger looked into the river and thought saw another tiger in the water.  He growled, but the "king", his reflection, growled too. Then he jumped into the water, believing there was another tiger there. Sang Kancil took his opportunity to escape. After fighting with his own reflection in the river, the tiger realized it was only his reflection. Fooled by Sang Kancil, the tiger wanted revenge and continues to hunt him down to this day.

References

External links
  Si Kancil dan Buaya
  Sang Kancil Counts the Crocodile

Indonesian folklore
Malaysian folklore
Fictional deer and moose
Animal tales